Albany was a New Zealand electorate. It was located in north Auckland, and named after the suburb of Albany. It existed from 1978 to 1984, and then was reinstated in 1987 before its final abolition in 2002.

Population centres
The 1977 electoral redistribution was the most overtly political since the Representation Commission had been established through an amendment to the Representation Act in 1886, initiated by Muldoon's National Government. As part of the 1976 census, a large number of people failed to fill out an electoral re-registration card, and census staff had not been given the authority to insist on the card being completed. This had little practical effect for people on the general roll, but it transferred Māori to the general roll if the card was not handed in. Together with a northward shift of New Zealand's population, this resulted in five new electorates having to be created in the upper part of the North Island. The electoral redistribution was very disruptive, and 22 electorates were abolished, while 27 electorates were newly created (including Albany) or re-established.

The Albany electorate was centred on Albany, which had previously been part of  electorate. Its territory extended southwards to include Greenhithe and Paremoremo (also formerly part of Waitemata), plus a large portion of Glenfield (formerly split between Waitemata and ). It extended northwards to include Okura, Orewa, and Stanmore Bay (which were formerly part of Rodney electorate). Glenfield and Greenhithe were split off to form the  electorate, and most of the remainder (including Albany itself) was absorbed into  electorate.

The 1987 electoral redistribution took the continued population growth in the North Island into account, and two additional general electorates were created, bringing the total number of electorates to 97. In the South Island, the shift of population to Christchurch had continued. Overall, three electorates were newly created, three electorates were recreated (including Albany), and four electorates were abolished. All of those electorates were in the North Island. Changes in the South Island were restricted to boundary changes. The Albany electorate was based around the portion of the former Albany which had been merged into Rodney, plus Greenhithe (which had become part of Glenfield). Glenfield itself remained its own electorate.

History
Don McKinnon of the National Party was the first representative of the electorate.

Members of Parliament
Key

Election results

1999 election

1996 election

1993 election

1990 election

1987 election

1981 election

1978 election

Notes

References

Historical electorates of New Zealand
1978 establishments in New Zealand
1984 disestablishments in New Zealand
1987 establishments in New Zealand
2002 disestablishments in New Zealand
Politics of the Auckland Region